Equinox is the fifth studio album by American rock band Styx, released in December 1975. The lead single "Lorelei" became Styx's second US Top 40 hit.

The album was the band's first release for A&M Records (with whom they had signed earlier in 1975, after the success of the 1973 single "Lady").

The album marked the final appearance of original Styx guitarist John Curulewski who left the band to spend time with his family.  Tommy Shaw replaced him.

Although Equinox stalled at number 58, it was certified Gold in 1977 shortly before the release of The Grand Illusion (1977).

Record World called "Light Up" an "uptempo effort" with "clean sound and infectious hooks."

Track listing
All lead vocals by Dennis DeYoung, except where noted.

Personnel

Styx
 Dennis DeYoung – vocals, keyboards 
 James "JY" Young – vocals, electric guitars
 John Curulewski – vocals, electric and acoustic guitars, synthesizers
 Chuck Panozzo – bass guitar, backing vocals on "Suite Madame Blue"
 John Panozzo – drums, percussion

Production
Producer - Styx
Engineer - Barry Mraz
Assistant engineer - Rob Kingsland
Remixing - Barry Mraz, Styx
Mastering - Doug Sax
Production assistant - Barry Mraz
Design - Chuck Beeson, Junie Osaki
Art direction - Roland Young
Photography - Chris Micoine

Charts
Album - Billboard (United States)

Singles - Billboard (United States)

References

External links 
 Styx - Equinox (1975) album review by Mike DeGagne, credits & releases at AllMusic.com
 Styx - Equinox (1975) album releases & credits at Discogs.com
 Styx - Equinox (1975) album to be listened as stream at Spotify.com

1975 albums
A&M Records albums
Styx (band) albums